An Advanced Thermal Recycling (ATR) system (or ATR system) is an advancement of existing energy-from-waste (EfW) technology. An ATR system converts municipal solid waste (MSW) into either electricity or steam for district heating or industrial customers. The combustion bottom ash and the combustion fly ash, along with the air pollution control system fly ash, are treated to produce products that can be beneficially reused. Specifically, ATR systems consist of the following:	
 Solid waste combustion, boiler and combustion control system, energy recovery and air pollution control equipment; 
 Combustion bottom ash and fly ash treatment systems that produce commercially reusable products; and
 An optional pre-processing system to recover recyclable materials contained in the MSW delivered to the facility before the MSW enters the thermal processing area of the facility.

Application in Germany 
As a result of the growing need to manage waste from throughout greater Hamburg, the first commercially operating ATR facility – the Müllverwertung Rugenberger Damm (MVR) in Hamburg, Germany – was commissioned in 1999. The German Green Party has endorsed the specific features of the MVR facility in its "Concept 2020" initiative to cease all landfilling of waste by 2020 as an essential part of an integrated waste management system achieving the highest standards in the EfW industry. No landfilling of unprocessed waste has been allowed in Germany since 2005, and all 27 countries in the European Community are required to adopt similar bans by 2020.

ATR process description 
Quality control occurs at the inception of the process. Overhead refuse cranes, which hold approximately 5 tons each, mix the waste in the bunker to create a homogeneous mixture. This is important for good combustion and low carbon content in the bottom ash by-product. These cranes then deliver the mixed waste into the feeding hopper which leads down onto highly engineered stoker grates which control the rate that waste travels through the boiler. The intense heat ignites the waste as it moves along the forward feeding grates until only the by-product bottom ash remains at the end of the grate. Each combustion line feeds a boiler that operates at a temperature above  for 2 seconds. The temperature in the combustion zone is measured through acoustic monitoring.

Careful monitoring of the combustion process guarantees complete burning of the combustible material in an environmentally safe manner. A highly sophisticated computer controls the temperature, the grate speed, the amount of air used and all other aspects of the process that enables complete combustion and minimization of emissions to occur.

The maintenance of the furnace's high temperature is essential to rid the waste and the resulting combustion gases of complex organic compounds such as dioxin/furans.

Converting waste heat to electricity. As the waste is combusted, heat is released in the boiler. This heat is used to produce high-pressure, high-temperature, super-heated steam, which generates electrical energy when passed through a turbine-generator. The electricity is fed into the public power grid or can be sold directly to a customer. The steam can also be exported directly for use in district heating or industrial processes.

Air pollution control. Each unit has an independent air pollution control system. Flue gas cleaning begins in the boiler, where oxides of nitrogen are reduced by injecting ammonia water into the combustion chamber. Lightly loaded absorbents (activated carbon from the second bag house) are injected into the flue gas downstream of the first bag house to separate any contaminants that have reformed (such as organic compounds like dioxins and furans), any condensed heavy metals, salts and other gaseous contaminants, as well as residue fly ash.

The first bag house is an essential part of the air pollution control system insofar as it makes it possible to produce reusable by-products such as hydrochloric acid and gypsum from the consecutive air pollution control process steps. Acid gases are removed from the flue gases by passing through a two-stage scrubber to remove acid components, especially halogen compounds such as hydrochloric acid and hydrofluoric acid. A counter flow neutral scrubber follows, using a lime slurry to remove sulphur oxides (SO2, SO3). The pollutant gases are either dissolved in water droplets (acids) or bound as calcium salts (SO2, SO3) and thereby are successfully removed from the flue gas. A second bag house acts as a polishing filter to capture any remaining aerosols, organic compounds and heavy metals, which thereby are reduced to levels usually below detection.

Converting combustion residue to marketable byproducts. The ATR process produces other marketable products in addition to energy. Following combustion, the material left consists of the non-combustible components of the waste and the inert materials produced during combustion. This is known as slag or bottom ash. The bottom ash is washed to eliminate soluble salts. Iron scrap and non-ferrous metals such as aluminium, copper and brass are separated and sold in secondary metals markets The bottom ash is then screened, crushed and sold for use as a construction material comparable to aggregate mined from a quarry or made from processed demolition waste.

Gypsum is created when the oxides of sulphur (SO2 and SO3) are separated by the single stage scrubber. It is purified, then sold to the construction industry.

The acid scrubbing process in the flue gas treatment system also produces a raw hydrochloric acid (HCl) with a concentration of 10%-12%. The acid is distilled (rectified) to yield commercial grade (30% concentration) hydrochloric acid.

Fly Ash Treatment. Fly ash, which is separated in the boiler and baghouses and constitutes up to 5% by weight of the combusted MSW, is treated to recover metals and minerals for reuse, resulting in an overall ATR process landfill diversion rate of approximately 98.5%.

Advantages of ATR 
ATR systems offer flue gas cleanup and emissions performance that meet or exceed the strictest clean air laws in the United States and the European Union. Emissions from an ATR plant contain fewer metals, dioxins and conventional pollutants than other EfW approaches.

ATR systems increase a facility’s “diversion rate” – the percentage of materials coming into plants that are destroyed or converted to energy and useful byproducts. The majority of EfW plants in the US, after incineration and recovery of some metals, combine both bottom ash and fly ash (20-25% of MSW input by weight) and send it to a landfill. ATR systems, by contrast, landfill less than 2 percent of a plant’s MSW input; all remaining MSW is converted into either energy or usable products.

References 

Recycling